Graham Spur is a mostly ice-covered spur, but with prominent bare rock exposures at the tip and near its center, located on the northwest side of Hughes Ice Piedmont,  south of James Nunatak, on the east side of Palmer Land. It was mapped by the United States Geological Survey in 1974, and was named by the Advisory Committee on Antarctic Names for William L. Graham, a United States Antarctic Research Program biologist and Station Scientific Leader at Palmer Station in 1972.

References

Ridges of Palmer Land